Taseko Mines Limited is a mid-tier copper producer located in British Columbia, Canada. It operates Gibraltar Mine, the second largest open-pit copper mine in Canada, and is in the planning stages for several other mines including the Prosperity Mine, Harmony, and Aley.  All production is sold at non-hedged market based prices. The market capitalization currently is roughly 740 million dollars.

Company history

1991 - Prosperity project acquired
July 1999 - Gibraltar acquired from Boliden
2002 - Harmony acquired
2004 - Gibraltar reopened due to high copper prices
2007 - Aley acquired

Proposed Projects

Prosperity Mine
The property includes 85 square km in south central British Columbia. A large copper and gold mineralization has been defined on the property containing around 5.3 billion lb copper and 13.3 million oz of gold.  The feasibility for the mine was completed on September 25, 2007 and the environmental review process began in July 2008.

Operations: Large open-pit copper and gold mine with projected production of 108 million lb per year and 247,000 oz of gold per year for 20 years.

Reserves

Cost:  ~800 million

In 2009, proven reserves for the mine were 481 million tonnes 0.46 gram per tonne of gold and 0.26 per cent copper. Probable reserves were estimated at 350 million tonnes grading 0.35 gram per tonne of gold and 0.18 per cent of copper (based on a $5.50 net smelter return cut-off).

Timeline
 1991 - acquired by Taseko Mines
 Sep 25, 2007 - feasibility study completed for 70,000 tonnes per day with 20 year mine life
 July 2008 - Environmental assessment begins
 November 2010 - initial open-pit proposal rejected by Canadian Environmental Assessment Agency review board. Environment Minister Jim Prentice and the minority Tory government support the rejection.
 November 2011 - Taseko President Russell Hallbauer sends a letter to Environment Minister Peter Kent suggesting that the proposal was rejected for "spiritual" rather than environmental reasons.
 2014 - Second rejection of mine by Harper government for environmental reasons
 January 2017 - Attempted revival of dead project that has no support from local First Nation

Harmony Mine
The Harmony property is located on Graham Island, the largest island of the Haida Gwaii archipelago, within the Queen Charlotte Islands, off the coast of British Columbia. The property contains a low-grade gold mineralization that can only be mined profitably at historically high gold prices.  Teseko has yet to explore this property and values the property at $1 on its balance sheet as of September 2004.

Status: Exploration asset

Reserves:
latest engineering study indicated 64 million tonnes at 1.52 grams per tonne.  In place resources are ~3 million oz of gold.

Cost: No projects pending

projects pending:  N/A

Timeline
1970's - property discovered
October 2001 - property acquired for 2.23 million dollars and preferred stock
September 30, 2004 - property value written down to nominal value of $1

Location: Aley
The Aley asset contains Niobium, a rare metal used in the production of special steel alloys that are corrosion resistant. Currently only 2 mines in the world produce the rare metal. The spot price of this metal has risen significantly in the last 5 years, from has low as $6.70 per lb in 2004 to ~$24.00 currently . The property is located near the shore of the lake, about 30 kilometers from the Camp.  The price of

Status: Exploration asset

Reserves: A feasibility study has not been completed thus-far. The resource estimates are 330-500 million lb with recoveries of which 65% may be recovered

Cost: N/A  feasibility study not completed

Timeline

1980's – Discovered by Cominco
June 2007 - Teseko acquires property for 1.5 million cash + ~894,730 common shares
2008 - Exploration of property begins

Financial information

Shares listed on the NYSE under the "TGB" symbol
Taseko owns 7.318 million shares of Continental Mining, a Chinese mining company

References

Sources

Prosperity Cost
 https://web.archive.org/web/20101231152349/http://www.tasekomines.com/i/pdf/TKO_Tribune_27Feb07_WeWantProsperity.pdf

100 million equipment purchase
 https://web.archive.org/web/20090223095703/http://tasekomines.com/tko/NewsReleases.asp?ReportID=309233&_Type=News-Releases&_Title=Taseko-Purchases-100-Million-in-Mining-and-Milling-Equipment

Phase III expansion
 https://web.archive.org/web/20090222184103/http://tasekomines.com/tko/NewsReleases.asp?ReportID=301338&_Type=News-Releases&_Title=Taseko-Proceeds-With-Phase-III-Expansion-At-Gibraltar-Mine

2007 Annual Report detailing all properties owned
 https://web.archive.org/web/20101231120217/http://www.tasekomines.com/i/tko/TKO_AR_2007.pdf

Market Capitalization
 https://finance.yahoo.com/q?d=t&s=TGB

CFO resignation
 http://www.foxbusiness.com/story/markets/industries/industrials/taseko-announces-change-executive-team/

External links
 

Companies listed on the Toronto Stock Exchange
Chilcotin Country
Mining in British Columbia